Galten is a fjard of Lake Mälaren, the third-largest lake in Sweden. It is the westernmost part of the lake, and is connected to the fjard of Blacken in the east through the strait of Kvicksund.

Notes

References

Mälaren